The Garden is a property located  north east of Alice Springs in the Northern Territory of Australia. It is run by Andy Hayes. The Hayes run both Hereford and Droughtmaster cattle on the  property.

In the 1940s a large poll shorthorn cattle herd was kept on the station.
  
In 1965, a portion of land was excised from the pastoral lease and was gazetted as the "Trephina Gorge Scenic Reserve".  This land was renamed in 1978 as the "Trephina Gorge Nature Park".

Quad-biking tours currently operate on the station.

See also
List of ranches and stations

References 

Pastoral leases in the Northern Territory
Stations (Australian agriculture)